Bengt von Hofsten (17 June 1747 – 10 November 1826), was a Swedish ironmaster and hovjunkare.

Life and work 
Bengt von Hofsten was born on June 17, 1747, in Karlskoga, Sweden, and was the third of five children of Erland and Christina von Hofsten (née Kolthoff). His father was an ironmaster at both Valåsen and Villingsberg Works. In 1760, he enrolled at Uppsala University.

In 1779, Bengt von Hofsten married Christina Lovisa Geijer at Lindfors Works, known as "nåda på Valåsen".

In 1796, Von Hofsten acquired Hönsäter Manor.

References

Works cited

Further reading 

 

1747 births
1826 deaths
19th-century Swedish landowners
Swedish ironmasters
People from Karlskoga Municipality
19th-century Swedish nobility
Bengt
19th-century Swedish politicians
18th-century ironmasters
19th-century ironmasters